Bill Clark is a former New York Police Department first grade detective and an award-winning television writer and producer. He was a veteran NYPD Detective First Grade before joining David Milch and Steven Bochco's NYPD Blue in the first season as technical consultant, drawing on his twenty-five years experience with New York undercover and homicide units to ensure that the series accurately and realistically portrayed the work of New York City detectives. He went on to win two Emmy Awards, and was also honored with a Writers Guild of America Award, a Peabody Award and two Humanitas Prize.

Biography
Born in St. John's, Newfoundland, Clark grew up in Brooklyn, New York, in an area now known as Park Slope.

Education
While on the NYPD, Clark attended the New York Institute of Technology on the G.I. Bill, graduating with a B.A. in Criminal Justice.

Military

At age 17, Clark joined the United States Army, with tours of duty in Europe and Vietnam as a member of the Infantry Division where he served as a scout dog handler, walking point with his German Shepherd Dog Mox, with the Forty-Sixth Infantry Platoon Scout Dog, Second Battalion, 14th Infantry Regiment.

While in the NYPD he joined the Army Reserve, entering at the rank of Staff Sergeant and retiring in 1989 as a Major.

N.Y.P.D.

Clark joined the New York City Police Department in 1969.  He worked a special undercover assignment for two years before entering the Police Academy.  In 1972 he earned his gold detective shield.  On December 31, 1994, Clark retired from the Queens Homicide Detective Squad as a First Grade Detective.

One of Clark's specialties on the force was interrogation. He worked on a number of headline cases ranging from the Son of Sam to crackdowns against the Gambino crime family.

His first assignment—even before he attended the Police Academy—was to infiltrate the Young Patriots Organization, an organization of white radicals who, he soon discovered, were planning to bomb several New York City landmarks.

Television credits
NYPD Blue (Writer, executive producer, technical advisor) (1993–2005)
Brooklyn South (Supervising producer) (1997)
Blind Justice (Executive producer) (2005)
John from Cincinnati (Consulting producer) (2007)

He has had featured acting roles on L.A. Law, John from Cincinnati, Fallen, CSI: Miami and NYPD Blue.

Clark appeared on Charlie Rose in 1995 along with David Milch.

Activision consulted with Clark on their 2005 release True Crime: New York City.

Awards and recognition

Emmy Awards
1995 Outstanding Drama Series (NYPD Blue)
1998 Outstanding Writing for a Drama Series (NYPD Blue, "Lost Israel (Part 2)")
Nominated: 1996 Outstanding Drama Series (NYPD Blue)
Nominated: 1997 Outstanding Drama Series (NYPD Blue)
Nominated: 1998 Outstanding Drama Series (NYPD Blue)
Nominated: 1998 Outstanding Writing for a Drama Series (NYPD Blue, "Lost Israel (Part 1)")
Nominated: 1999 Outstanding Drama Series (NYPD Blue)
Nominated: 1999 Outstanding Writing for a Drama Series (NYPD Blue, "Hearts and Souls")
Nominated: 2002 Outstanding Writing for a Variety, Music or Comedy Program (America: A Tribute to Heroes)

Humanitas Prize
1999 90 Minute Category (NYPD Blue)
Nominated: 1999 60 Minute Category (NYPD Blue, "Raging Bulls")

Peabody Award
1998 NYPD Blue, "Raging Bulls"
2001 America: A Tribute to Heroes

Writers Guild of America Award
1997 Episodic Drama (NYPD Blue, "Girl Talk")

Edgar Award
Nominated: 1999 Best Television Episode (Brooklyn South, "Skel in a Cell", "Fools Russian")
Nominated: 2002 Best Television Episode (NYPD Blue, "Johnny Got His Gold")
Nominated: 2003 Best Television Episode (NYPD Blue, "Ho Down")

People's Choice
1998 New Favorite TV Drama: Brooklyn South

U.S. Army
Republic of Vietnam Campaign Medal
Army Reserve Components Training Ribbon
Army Service Ribbon
Vietnam Service Medal
National Defense Service Medal with Silver Oak Leaf Cluster
Good Conduct Medal with Oak Leaf Cluster
Army Achievement Medal
Army Commendation Medal
Meritorious Service Medal
Combat Infantry Badge

Author
He co-authored, along with NYPD Blue co-creator and executive producer David Milch, True Blue: The Real Stories Behind NYPD Blue (1995).

See also

References

External links

Profile : HBO

Recalling a City in Fear During the Year of 'Son of Sam' : The New York Times
Profile : Variety.com
Podcast : "A City Looks Back: The Hunt For Sam"
True Crime with Bill Clark : XBox365 Interview
NYPD Blues Praise TV Version : The New York Times
Out of N.Y.P.D., into 'N.Y.P.D. Blue' : The New York Times

Living people
United States Army personnel of the Vietnam War
Television producers from New York City
American television writers
American male television writers
New York City Police Department officers
Writers from Brooklyn
Writers from St. John's, Newfoundland and Labrador
United States Army reservists
United States Army officers
Writers Guild of America Award winners
Screenwriters from New York (state)
Year of birth missing (living people)